The Museum of the African Diaspora (MoAD) is a contemporary art museum in San Francisco, California. MoAD holds exhibitions and presents artists exclusively of the African diaspora, one of only a few museums of its kind in the United States. Located at 685 Mission St. adjacent to the St. Regis Hotel in the Yerba Buena Arts District, MoAD is a nonprofit organization as well as a Smithsonian Affiliate. Prior to 2014, MoAD educated visitors on the history, culture, and art of the African diaspora through permanent and rotating exhibitions. After a six-month refurbishment in 2014 to expand the gallery spaces, the museum reopened and transitioned into presenting exclusively fine arts exhibitions. MoAD does not have a permanent collection and instead works directly with artists or independent curators when developing exhibitions.

Mission 
MoAD "celebrates Black cultures, ignites challenging conversations, and inspires learning through the global lens of the African Diaspora."

History
MoAD was developed as part of a public/private partnership led by the San Francisco Redevelopment Agency. In 1999, the City of San Francisco created a mandate to include an African-American cultural presence in the last vacant parcel of Yerba Buena Gardens. San Francisco Mayor Willie L. Brown appointed a steering committee to determine the mission and scope of a cultural facility within the complex.

The African American Cultural Institute grew out of a research and development process that began in 2002. The new museum was renamed the Museum of the African Diaspora to reflect a broadened scope and mission, and incorporated as a 501 (c)(3) nonprofit organization. The space was designed by the Freelon Group within the St. Regis Hotel, a 42-story skyscraper that apart from the museum consists of luxury condominiums and a five-star hotel. MoAD opened its doors in 2005.

Linda Harrison was appointed as the executive director of MoAD in November 2013. In June 2014, MoAD underwent a six-month renovation that created more gallery space and refreshed the museum's overall look. By October 2014, MoAD was named an official Smithsonian Affiliate. Harrison left MoAD in 2018 to head the Newark Museum in New Jersey.

Monetta White, who has been involved with MoAD since its inception in 2005, was appointed as executive director in December 2019.

The Original Museum of the African Diaspora 
Before 2014, when the MoAD revised its mission to center on contemporary art, the museum used to introduce visitors to the original African diaspora—the original movement of Homo sapiens (from the earliest human remains found in Africa)—to eventually all inhabited regions. The museum asks visitors "when did you first realize you are African?" The museum espouses the scientifically accepted idea of panethnicity, wherein all humans have a common African origin.

Emerging Artists Program 
The Emerging Artists Program at the Museum of the African Diaspora was launched concurrently with the celebration of the institution's 10th anniversary, and receives support from the Institute of Museum and Library services.
 Tim Roseborough and Cheryl Derricotte, 2015–2016
 Nyame Brown, Helina Metaferia, Lili Bernard, and Angie Keller, 2016–2017

Past exhibitions

See also

List of museums focused on African Americans

References

External links

 
 New African Diaspora Museum in 2005

Museums established in 2005
Art museums established in 2005
Museums in San Francisco
History museums in California
African-American museums in California
Anthropology museums in California
Museums of human migration
2005 establishments in California
South of Market, San Francisco
Museums of the African diaspora